Juan Fernández de Rosillo or Juan Fernández de Rovillo (1533 – 29 October 1606) was a Roman Catholic prelate who served as Bishop of Michoacán (1603–1606) and Bishop of Verapaz (1592–1603).

Biography
Juan Fernández de Rosillo was born in Spain in 1533.
On 12 June 1592, he was appointed during the papacy of Pope Clement VIII as Bishop of Verapaz.
In 1592, he was consecrated bishop by Antonio de Hervias, Bishop of Cartagena.
On 29 October 1606, he was appointed during the papacy of Pope Paul V as Bishop of Michoacán.
He served as Bishop of Michoacán until his death on 29 October 1606.

References

External links and additional sources
 (for Chronology of Bishops) 
 (for Chronology of Bishops) 
 (for Chronology of Bishops) 
 (for Chronology of Bishops) 

16th-century Roman Catholic bishops in Guatemala
17th-century Roman Catholic bishops in Guatemala
Bishops appointed by Pope Clement VIII
Bishops appointed by Pope Paul V
1533 births
1606 deaths
17th-century Roman Catholic bishops in Mexico
Roman Catholic bishops of Verapaz